The 2008 LEN European Aquatics Championships were held in Eindhoven, Netherlands, from 13–24 March 2008. They were the European championships for swimming (50 m), diving and synchronised swimming for 2008. Two new events were contested: the 800 m freestyle men and the 1500 m freestyle women. This is the first time that the men's and women's swimming programs are identical.

Medal table

Swimming

Medal table

Men's events

Women's events

Diving

Medal table

Results

Men's events

Women's events

Synchronised swimming

Medal table

Results

See also 
LEN European Aquatics Championships
Ligue Européenne de Natation (LEN)

External links

Tournament's official site
 Swim Rankings Results

European Championships
S
LEN European Aquatics Championships
A
Sports competitions in Eindhoven
March 2008 sports events in Europe
21st century in Eindhoven